State Highway NASA Road 1 (also NASA Parkway  and NASA Road 1) is an east–west state highway that runs from Interstate 45 (I-45) in Webster to State Highway 146/future State Highway 99 (SH 146/future SH 99) in Seabrook. The highway is a six- to eight-lane divided highway for most of its length. A portion of the road is a four-lane controlled-access highway that bypasses the central businesses of Webster. The highway is the main route to NASA's Lyndon B. Johnson Space Center. It is one of only two Texas state highways with an official designation beginning with a letter; the other is SH OSR.

History
The highway was originally designated as Farm to Market Road 528 (FM 528) in 1945, but upon the opening of Johnson Space Center, the portion of FM 528 from I-45 to SH 146 was redesignated as NASA Road 1.

Route description
NASA Road 1 begins at I-45 in Webster and heads towards the northeast through Webster intersecting SH 3 and FM 270. The highway passes along the southern boundary of the Johnson Space Center and provides access to the center. The highway follows the north shore of Clear Lake and ends at SH 146/future SH 99 in Seabrook.

NASA 1 Bypass Freeway is a freeway that passes to the south of Webster. The contract for construction was awarded in 2004 and it opened in December 2008. The freeway consists of two direct access ramps which are convenient for travelers coming to and from Houston. One of these ramps provides southbound travelers from I-45 with direct access to the bypass (flying over I-45 in a three-tier stack configuration), and the other provides travelers with the opportunity to merge onto I-45 northbound without encountering any traffic signals. Motorists coming from Galveston (I-45 northbound) have to encounter a traffic signal at Kobayashi Road before experiencing the uninterrupted flow of the freeway. The freeway bypasses much of the congestion in inner-city Webster, giving easy access to Johnson Space Center.

Major junctions

References

External links

NASA Road 1
Johnson Space Center
Transportation in Harris County, Texas